The Second level basketball leagues in Bosnia and Herzegovina are a 2nd-tier men's professional basketball competitions in Bosnia and Herzegovina. The tier is composed of three regional divisions: the A1 League, the Herzeg-Bosnia League, and the First League of Republika Srpska. 

The A1 League, operated by the Sarajevo Basketball Association, has 14 teams. The Herzeg-Bosnia League, operated by the Herzeg-Bosnia Basketball Association, has 9 teams. The First League of Republika Srpska, operated by the Basketball Association of Republika Srpska, has 12 teams.

History
The division champions of the 2nd-tier leagues in Bosnia and Herzegovina:

Current clubs 
The following is the list of clubs for the 2019–20 season.

A1 League

Herzeg-Bosnia League

First League of Republika Srpska

References

External links 
 
 
 
 
 Profile at Eurobasket.com

3
Bosnia